"Osama" is a song by South African singer Zakes Bantwini and Kasango, released on September 10, 2021, as a lead single from Bantwini's  third studio album Ghetto King. It was produced by Bonga Ntozini, Kasmario Ike Fankis, and
Zakhele Madida.

The song debuted number one in South Africa, where it remained for ten weeks.
An official music video for "Osama" was released on December 31, 2021, directed by Darion 4K.
Within 10 month's of its release, the song was certified 4× platinum in South Africa with more than 120 000 thousand units sold.

Background 
Zake's teased "Osama" on his mix playlist at Kunye event, released date was announced via his Twitter account which was set to be released on September 21, 2021. Due to high demand  from fans the song was rescheduled to September 10.

Commercial performance 
The song was certified 4× platinum in South Africa.

Composition 
"Osama" was written by Zakhele Madida, Bonga Ntozini, Nana Atta, and Kasmario Ike Fankis. The song's lyrics discuss protection, wisdom, strength, power and are sung in Glossolalia.

Music video 
"Osama" music was released on December 31, 2021. The music video was directed by Darion 4K.  The videos production team includes Focalistic, Riky Rick, Aubrey Qwana and Manu Worldstar.

The video features South African actor John Kani appears in a brief voice  on song's introduction. As of February  2022, the music video has received over 1 million views on YouTube.

Awards 
"Osama" was nominated for Favourite Song at the 2022 DStv  Mzansi Viewers Choice Awards. The song won Best Collaboration and SAMRO Highest Airplay Award at the 28th South African Music Awards.

|-
| rowspan="3"|2022
| rowspan="3" style="text-align:center;" | "Osama"
| Favourite Song
| 
|-
| Best Collaboration 
| 
|-
| Highest Airplay 
|

Charts

Certification and sales

Personnel 
"Osama" credits adapted from AllMusic.

 Nana Atta - composer 
 Zakhele Madida - composer, producer 
 Kasango - primary artist 
 Bonga Ntozini - composer, producer
 Kasmario Ike Fankis - composer, producer

References 

 2021 singles
 2021 songs
Number-one singles in South Africa